John William Westhead (first ¼ 1966 – 29 May 2000) was an English professional rugby league footballer who played in the 1980s and 1990s.

Background
John Westhead's birth was registered in Ince, Lancashire, England, and he died aged 34 in Leigh, Greater Manchester.

Career
Westhead made his début for Leigh in 1983 in a 22–13 victory over Barrow. He went to make over 100 appearances for the club, scoring 25 tries, but was forced to retire in 1990 due a recurring shoulder injury. He also made three appearances for Great Britain Under-21s between 1985 and 1986.

Death
On 29 May 2000, Westhead severed an artery after smashing his arm through a glass panel at his home in Leigh, Greater Manchester. He was taken to Royal Bolton Hospital, but died due to severe blood loss shortly after arriving.

References

1966 births
2000 deaths
English rugby league players
Great Britain under-21 national rugby league team players
Leigh Leopards players
Rugby league players from Wigan
Rugby league second-rows
Accidental deaths in England